L. pallescens may refer to:

Lactarius pallescens, a mushroom species
Littoraria pallescens, a sea snail species
Luzula pallescens, a flowering plant species